"Lazy Eye" is a song recorded by the Goo Goo Dolls for the soundtrack of the 1997 film Batman & Robin starring George Clooney.  It is the band's first studio recording to feature Mike Malinin on drums. "Lazy Eye" was released in a promotional format only.

Music video 
A music video was released  1997. It features the band performing the song in a dimly lit warehouse, with clips from the film interspersed throughout the duration.

Track listing

"Lazy Eye" - 3:45

Charts

References

Goo Goo Dolls songs
1997 singles
Batman music
Batman (1989 film series)
1997 songs
Warner Records singles
Songs written by John Rzeznik